Perssin (stands for Perserikatan Sepakbola Sinjai) is an  Indonesian football club based in Sinjai Regency, South Sulawesi. They currently compete in the Liga 3.

Players

Coaching staff

References

External links
Persin Sinjai at Liga-Indonesia.co.id
 

Football clubs in Indonesia
Football clubs in South Sulawesi
Association football clubs established in 1970
1970 establishments in Indonesia